Harroun is a surname. Notable people with the name include:

 Eric Harroun (1982–2014), American Jihadist in the Syrian Civil War
 Ray Harroun (1879–1968), American racecar driver and pioneering constructor

See also
 Harroun, American automobile in production from 1917 to 1922